The Chlein Seehorn is a mountain of the Silvretta Alps, located east of Klosters in the canton of Graubünden. It lies west of the higher Gross Seehorn.

References

External links
 Chlein Seehorn on Hikr

Mountains of the Alps
Mountains of Graubünden
Mountains of Switzerland
Klosters-Serneus